FSOM may refer to:

 Future Sound of Melbourne, an electronic music trio from Australia, formed in 1990.
 Federated States of Micronesia
 Frost School of Music